Ravioles du Dauphiné (in English, 'Dauphiné ravioli'), also known as Ravioles de Romans ('Ravioli of Romans'), are a French regional speciality consisting of two layers of pasta made out of tender wheat flour, eggs and water, surrounding a filling of Comté or French Emmental cheese, cottage cheese made of cow's milk, butter and parsley, akin to Italian ravioli or Russian pelmeni. As the name suggests, they are usually associated with the historical region of Dauphiné in South-Central France, particularly around the town of Romans-sur-Isère in the department of Drôme, Auvergne-Rhône-Alpes. The Ravioles du Dauphiné appellation has been legally protected since 1989, and received the Label Rouge in 1998, however is not an AOC as it makes use of ingredients such as Emmental and Comté which originate outside the Dauphiné region.

History

While ravioles have their origin in ancient Roman cuisine, the first mention of them dates from 1228. They were widely consumed in the Dauphiné region during the Middle Ages, filled with either meat or root vegetables. Meatless ravioles were often consumed either by poor people or around Lent or other periods of fasting. The first mention of ravioles specifically from the town of Romans dates from 1807, when the use of vegetables started to be replaced by cheese as the local population became more prosperous.

By the 1960s, ravioles started to become produced on an industrial scale, with 100 tonnes of ravioles being produced annually by 1975. Since the 90s ravioles have also become available in supermarkets.

Geographical origin

Ravioles du Dauphiné are produced in Romans-sur-Isère and more generally in the region of Royans overlapping the two departments of Drôme and Isère, Auvergne-Rhône-Alpes. Any eggs or creme cheese used in the making of ravioles must also come from this region.

Production and commercialisation

Around 2500 tonnes of Ravioles were produced in 2005, which by 2007 had more than doubled to 5103 tonnes.

Ravioles are usually sold in plaques of 48 pieces, with each plaque weighing around 60-65 grams, and are often eaten in regional restaurants and notably during the Festival of Ravioles and Pognes (another local speciality roughly resembling a doughnut) held in the town of Romans every September, or at the traditional Raviole Festival of Eymeux.

Gastronomy
Ravioles can be prepared by poaching in hot water or grilled in a frying pan, then served in meat broth, in a gratin or with salad.

Bibliography
Laurent Jacquot, Société d'Etudes Historiques de Romans - Bourg de Péage, Pour écrire l'histoire de la raviole, Etudes Drômoises, 1996.

See also
Ravioli
List of dumplings
French cuisine

References

External links

Raviole du Dauphiné, site of the Institut national de l'origine et de la qualité (INAO)

Cuisine of Auvergne-Rhône-Alpes
French cuisine
Food and drink in France